Tolgay is a Turkish given name for males. Notable people with the surname include:

 Tolgay Arslan (born 1990), German-Turkish football player
 Tolgay Özbey (born 1986), Australian-Turkish football player

Turkish masculine given names